Engin Günaydın (born 29 January 1972) is a Turkish actor and comedian.

Biography
Günaydın was born in Erbaa, Tokat Province. He began his university studies at Hacettepe University Conservatory, but in his second year he switched to Mimar Sinan University from where he graduated in theatre.

In 1997, he had a small role in Otogargara which caused him to be cast in the television series Bir Demet Tiyatro where he played Zabıta İrfan. Later he acted in Aşkım Aşkım with Mehmet Ali Erbil and Emel Sayın. In 2001, he acted in Zeki Demirkubuz's film Yazgı for which he received the Best Supporting Actor Award at the Ankara Film Festival. In 2004, he began doing sketches on Okan Bayülgen's show. In 2005, he accepted an offer from Gülse Birsel and joined the cast of the sitcom Avrupa Yakası as Burhan Altıntop, his most famous role. In 2009, he wrote the screenplay of and starred in Vavien directed by the Taylan Brothers. For this, he won a number of screenwriting awards at the Istanbul Film Festival, Yeşilçam Awards and the SİYAD awards.

Additionally, he did a series of stand up shows titled O Hikayedeki Mal Benim.

He shared the Adana Golden Boll International Film Festival's Best Actor Award in 2012 together with İlyas Salman for his role in Inside.

Filmography

References
Biography of Engin Günaydın

External links
 

1972 births
Living people
People from Erbaa
Turkish comedians
Turkish male film actors
Turkish male television actors
Turkish male stage actors
Mimar Sinan Fine Arts University alumni
Best Actor Golden Boll Award winners